Androgen-induced hermaphroditism is a syndrome resulting from a hermaphroditic birth defect of the genital organs.  They are induced in the 46,XX gonadally female fetus.  This occurs when there is too much masculinizing hormone transmitted through the placenta. The external genitalia are that of a male. If there is an excess of androgens in a male fetus it will give rise to infant hercules syndrome.

References
 J Money Sin, Sickness, or Status? Homosexual Gender Identity and Psychoneuroendocrinology

Supernumerary body parts
Intersex variations